Landulf II may refer to:

 Landulf II of Capua (c. 825 – 879)
 Landulf II of Benevento (died 961)
 Landulf II (Archbishop of Benevento) (died 1119)